is believed by Zen Buddhists to be a method of achieving samādhi (Japanese: 三昧 sanmai), which is a unification with the highest reality. Hitsuzendo refers specifically to a school of Japanese Zen calligraphy to which the rating system of modern calligraphy (well-proportioned and pleasing to the eye) is foreign. Instead, the calligraphy of Hitsuzendo must breathe with the vitality of eternal experience.

Origins
Yokoyama Tenkei (1885–1966), inspired by the teachings of Yamaoka Tesshu (1836–1888), founded the Hitsuzendo line of thought as a "practice to uncover one's original self through the brush." This was then further developed by Omori Sogen Roshi as a way of Zen practice. Hitsuzendo is practised standing, using a large brush and ink, usually on newspaper roll. In this way, the whole body is used to guide the brush, in contrast to writing at a table.

History

Calligraphy was brought to Japan from China and Chinese masters such as Wang Xizhi 王羲之 (Jp: Ou Gishi; 303-361) have had a profound influence, especially on the karayō style which is still practiced today. The indigenous Japanese wayō tradition (和様書道, wayō-shodō) only appeared towards the end of the Heian era. However, the calligraphy of Zen scholars was often more concerned with spiritual qualities and individual expression and shunned technicalities which led to unique and distinctly personal styles. Japanese calligraphy has three basic styles: Kaisho 楷書, Gyōsho 行書, and Sōsho 草書, adopted from China.

Philosophical background
True creativity is not the product of consciousness but rather the "phenomenon of life itself." True creation must arise from mu-shin 無心, the state of "no-mind," in which thought, emotions, and expectations do not matter. Truly skilful Zen calligraphy is not the product of intense "practice;" rather, it is best achieved as the product of the "no-mind" state, a high level of spirituality, and a heart free of disturbances.

To write Zen calligraphic characters that convey truly deep meaning, one must focus intensely and become one with the meaning of the characters they create. In order to do this, one must free one's mind and heart of disturbances and focus only on the meaning of the character. Becoming one with what you create, essentially, is the philosophy behind Zen Calligraphy and other Japanese arts.

See also 
Zenga
Bokuseki

References

 Terayama, Tanchu. Zen Brushwork - Focusing The Mind With Calligraphy And Painting 

East Asian calligraphy
Japanese calligraphy
Zen Buddhist philosophical concepts
Japanese art
Visual motifs
Zen art and culture
Zenga